Oak is an unincorporated community in west-central DeKalb County, in the U.S. state of Missouri.

The community is on Missouri routes 31 and 6 8.5 miles west of Maysville and five miles north of Clarksdale.

History
A post office called Oak was established in 1894, and remained in operation until 1906. The community most likely was named for the oaks at the original town site.

References

Unincorporated communities in DeKalb County, Missouri
Unincorporated communities in Missouri